Sharam is a 1982 Indian Malayalam film, directed by Joshiy and produced by Thiruppathi Chettiyar. The film stars Sukumaran, Srividya, Jagathy Sreekumar and Jose Prakash in the lead roles. The film has musical score by K. J. Joy. Though it did not make expected success at the box-office .  The film was a remake of Tamil film Vidiyum Varai Kaathiru.

Cast
 
Sukumaran as Sunil 
Srividya 
Jagathy Sreekumar 
Jose Prakash 
Sathaar
Ambika 
K. P. Ummer 
Janardhanan 
Ranipadmini

Soundtrack
The music was composed by K. J. Joy and the lyrics were written by Devadas.

References

External links
 

1982 films
1980s Malayalam-language films
Indian thriller films
Malayalam remakes of Tamil films
Films directed by Joshiy
1982 thriller films